Columnea rubricaulis is a species of Gesneriaceae that is native to Honduras and Nicaragua.

References

External links
 
 

rubricaulis
Plants described in 1936
Flora of Honduras